SLC may refer to:

Places
 Salt Lake City, Utah
 Salt Lake City International Airport, IATA Airport Code
 South Lanarkshire Council

Education
 Sarah Lawrence College, NY
 School Leaving Certificate (Nepal)
 St. Lawrence College, Ontario, Canada
 Small Learning Community
 Student Loans Company, UK
 SUNY Libraries Consortium

Science and technology
 Signaling line circuit, an addressable fire alarm circuit
 Single-level cell, a type of flash memory
 Solute carrier family of membrane transport proteins
 Stanford Linear Collider
 Subscriber loop carrier, providing telephone interface functionality
 Searchlight Control radar, UK, WWII
 Secondary lymphoid-tissue chemokine, a cytokine
 Slc., the abbreviation for the orchid genus × Sophrolaeliocattleya, a synonym of × Laeliocattleya
 Submarine laser communication

Sports
 Southland Conference
 Southwestern Lacrosse Conference
 Sri Lanka Cricket

Other uses
 Saint Lucia Cross, of the Order of Saint Lucia
 Sounds Like Chicken, a music group
 Suspended Looping Coaster, a roller coaster model
 SLC Agrícola, a Brazilian agribusiness company
 Mercedes-Benz SLC-Class of car
 Supreme Lanka Coalition, a political alliance in Sri Lanka

See also